William Renwick Smedberg III (September 28, 1902 – October 5, 1994) was a vice admiral in the United States Navy. He was Superintendent of the United States Naval Academy in Annapolis, Maryland from March 16, 1956 to June 27, 1958. After the war, he served as an aide to  Secretary of the Navy James Forrestal.
He was a 1926 graduate of the Naval Academy. He is interred in the Arlington National Cemetery along with his father, Brigadier General William Renwick Smedberg Jr., USA, and his son  Rear Admiral William Renwick Smedberg IV, USN.  Smedberg had also commanded the USS Iowa.

References

External links
 William Renwick Smedberg Papers, 1947–1963 MS 238 held by Special Collections & Archives, Nimitz Library at the United States Naval Academy

Superintendents of the United States Naval Academy
United States Navy admirals
1902 births
1994 deaths
United States Navy personnel of World War II
Burials at Arlington National Cemetery
20th-century American academics